The 2010 Jordan FA Shield was the 29th Jordan FA Shield to be played.

All 12 teams of 2010–11 Jordan League played in this competition. The Teams were divided into three groups.

Group A
Final Standings

Group B

Final Standings

Group C

Final Standings

Semi-finals

Final

Jordan Shield Cup
Shield